Hồ Thanh Minh (born 7 February 2000) is a Vietnamese professional footballer who plays as a forward for V.League 2 club Huế.

Club career
Thanh Minh did athletics before becoming a footballer.

Two years after his debut in the U-17 youth team of Huế FC, Thanh Minh was summoned to the first team by coach Nguyễn Đức Dũng, but he spent most of his first season as a backup for his teammate of the same age, Trần Danh Trung. After Trung left Huế, the 20-year-old Thanh Minh became the main striker of the team.

International career
Thanh Minh participated at the 2022 AFC U-23 Asian Cup qualification phase, scoring the winning goal against Myanmar, as well as the 2021 Southeast Asian Games.

International goals

Vietnam U-23

Personal life
Thanh Minh comes from a farming family belonging to the Tà Ôi ethnic group in A Lưới, Thừa Thiên Huế.

Honours
Vietnam U23
Southeast Asian Games: 2021

References

External links
 

2000 births
Living people
Vietnamese footballers
Vietnam youth international footballers
Association football forwards
V.League 2 players
People from Thừa Thiên-Huế province
Competitors at the 2021 Southeast Asian Games
Southeast Asian Games competitors for Vietnam